Abbé Pierre Joseph Bonnaterre (1752, Aveyron – 20 September 1804, Saint-Geniez-d'Olt) was a French zoologist who contributed sections on cetaceans, mammals, birds, reptiles, amphibians, fish, and insects to the Tableau encyclopédique et méthodique. He is also notable as the first scientist to study the feral child Victor of Aveyron.

Bonnaterre is credited with identifying about 25 new species of fish, and assembled illustrations of about 400 in his encyclopedia work of book.

He was the first scientist to study Victor, the wild child of Aveyron, whose life inspired François Truffaut for his film The Wild Child.

Partial bibliography 
 Tableau encyclopédique et méthodique des trois règnes de la nature, dix-huitième partie, insectes. Agasse, Paris 1797.
 Recueil de médecine vétérinaire ou Collection de mémoires d'instructions et de recettes sur les maladies des animaux domestiques.
 Tableau encyclopédique et méthodique des trois règnes de la nature ..., cétologie, ophiologie, erpétologie. Padoue 1795.
 Tableau encyclopédique et méthodique des trois règnes de la nature, Ophiologie. Panckoucke, Paris 1790.
 Tableau encyclopédique et méthodique des trois règnes de la nature, ornithologie. Panckoucke, Paris 1790/91.
 Tableau encyclopédique et méthodique des trois règnes de la nature ... Cétologie. Panckoucke, Paris 1789.
 Tableau encyclopédique et méthodique des trois règnes de la nature ..., Erpétologie. Panckoucke, Paris 1789/90.

See also
:Category:Taxa named by Pierre Joseph Bonnaterre

References 

 drop table

French naturalists
French zoologists
1752 births
1804 deaths
French entomologists
French ichthyologists
French ornithologists
French taxonomists
Cetologists
18th-century French zoologists
19th-century French zoologists